Christine Aschbacher (born 10 July 1983) is an Austrian People's Party politician who served in the Second Kurz government as minister of labour, family and youth between January 2020 and January 2021.

Early life and education 
Aschbacher was born in Wundschuh, a small town in Styria. She studied Management, Organizational Consulting and Human Resources Management as well as Marketing and Sales, receiving a master's degree in 2006. She began doctoral studies in Industrial Engineering and Management at the Slovak University of Technology in Bratislava in 2011 and received the PhD from Bratislava in August of 2020.

Professional activities 
She worked for Piewald Management Training from 2003 to 2006, and then (2006-2012) as a consultant at Capgemini Consulting. She served on the team of Maria Fekter (Minister of Finance) from June, 2012 to December, 2013. 2014 she led the department of Risk Management. From October, 2014 to May, 2015 she served on the staff of Reinhold Mitterlehner in the Ministry for Education, Research and Economics. She opened the Aschbacher Advisory Agency in September of 2015.

Family 
Christine Aschbacher is married and has three children. Her sister Barbara Walch was elected Mayor of Wundschuh in 2019. Their father, Alois Kowald, was mayor of Neudorf ob Wildon and her uncle Josef Kowald was a member of the Styrian state parliament.

Political career 
Chancellor of Austria Sebastian Kurz appointed Aschbacher to his cabinet in January 2020; she resigned amid thesis plagiarism scandal. According to allegations first levied by blogger Stefan Weber, Aschbacher has committed plagiarism and academic fraud in two these. According to Weber, that thesis includes a variety of “gobbledygook, nonsense and plagiarism” with over 20% of the paper coming from other sources that are not cited.

Plagiarism scandal and resignation 
On January 7, 2021, plagiarism researcher Stefan Weber exposed serious errors and plagiarism in Aschbacher's master's thesis, submitted to a college in Wiener Neustadt where she had been enrolled from 2002 to 2006. It soon became clear that the thesis was not only heavily plagiarized; other parts were written in rambling, grammatically incorrect German. The same was true of the doctoral dissertation which she submitted to a Slovak university while serving as minister in 2020. On 9 January 2021, Aschbacher resigned from her post as minister.

References

External links 
Christine Aschbacher on the Austrian Parliament website

1983 births
Living people

Government ministers of Austria
Women government ministers of Austria
People involved in plagiarism controversies
People involved in scientific misconduct incidents
Austrian People's Party politicians
21st-century Austrian women politicians
21st-century Austrian politicians
People from Styria